Robert Charles Edner (born October 5, 1988) is an American actor, singer, and dancer. He was a member of the boy band called Varsity Fan Club.

Early life
Edner was born in Downey, California to Robert and Cindy (née Halverson) Edner. He is the older brother of Ashley Edner (b. 1990), who is also an actress.

Career
Edner's first credit was in 1997, as "Chip" in a straight-to-video Mary-Kate and Ashley Olsen release. After bit parts on various television shows, he made his first film appearance in 1999's The Muse, in the role of "Boy at Sarah's House". His role in the film Spy Kids 3-D: Game Over earned him the nickname "Spy Kid" from fellow Varsity Fanclub members. Edner has also made numerous guest appearances on television shows, including Charmed, Judging Amy, 7th Heaven, and Veronica Mars. Edner's acting work has been sporadic since the early 2000s, with gaps of several years between acting credits; his most recent role was in the 2015 film Dutch Hollow.

He has also done some voice work, providing additional ADR in films, including Agent Cody Banks, Kangaroo Jack, and Monsters, Inc., and was the English-language voice of Final Fantasy XII character Vaan. Edner has also worked in commercials and is the brother of Ashley Edner. Edner is a former member of the Hollywood Knights celebrity basketball team, and the NBA Entertainment League (NBAE).

Dancing and music career
Edner's dancing landed him a featured role dancing like Michael Jackson in the music video for Alien Ant Farm's cover version of "Smooth Criminal"; he appeared in Jennifer Lopez's "Ain't It Funny", as well.

Edner dueted with Alexa PenaVega on the song "Heart Drive" from the film Spy Kids 3-D: Game Over. He also co-wrote the song "Alone" with Ryan Cabrera.

From 2008 to 2011, Edner was a member of the boy band Varsity Fan Club, whose members have included David Lei Brandt, Drew Ryan Scott, Jayk Purdy, TC Carter and Thomas Fiss. On April 30, 2011, and May 1, 2011, Edner posted a series of public messages on his Twitter profile publicly discussing conflicts with the band's new (and as yet unsigned manager), Philipp Hallenberger. Edner claimed that he was not informed of an April 2011 Varsity Fanclub photo shoot and that he was being "forced out" of the band by Hallenberger. Edner posted on April 30, 2011: "Trust me, this is not my decision and I will be fighting this. I want nothing more than to be in this group and have no intention to quit."

Later years

In 2013, Edner became a personal fitness trainer for PUSH Private Fitness.

Awards and nominations

|-
| 1999
| Step by Step
| Youth in Film Award for Best Guest Starring Performance in a TV Comedy Series
|  (5-way tie)
|-
| 2000
| Touched by an Angel
| Young Artist Award for Best Guest Starring Performance in a TV Drama Series
| 
|-
| 2001
| The Trial of Old Drum
| Young Artist Award for Best Leading Performance in a television film (Drama)
| 
|-
| 2002
| The Day the World Ended
| Young Artist Award for Best Leading Performance in a television film (Comedy or Drama)
| 
|-
| 2002
| Charmed
| Young Artist Award for Best Guest Starring Performance in a TV Drama Series
| 
|-
| 2003
| Do Over
| Young Artist Award for Best Guest Starring Performance in a TV Comedy Series
| 
|-
| 2004
| Spy Kids 3-D: Game Over
| Young Artist Award for Best Young Ensemble in a Feature Film (group award)
|

Discography

Soundtracks
 Spy Kids 3-D: Game Over (2003) Song: "Heart Drive" performed with Alexa Vega

Filmography

Film and television work

 Sing Along Songs: Pongo & Perdita (1996) as Himself
 Late Last Night (1999) as The Stranger Danger Kid
 The Muse (1999) as Boy at Sarah's House
 The Trial of Old Drum (2000) as Charlie Burden Jr.
 The Seventh Sense (2001) as Kyle
 The Penny Promise (2001) as Dustin Farnsworthy
 The Day the World Ended (2001) as Ben Miller/McCann
 Haunted Lighthouse (2003) as Edgar
 Spy Kids 3-D: Game Over (2003) as Francis
 Welcome to Paradise (2006) as Hayden Laramie

Television series guest-starring roles

 You're Invited To Mary-Kate and Ashley's Christmas Party (1997) as Chip
 Step By Step (1997) as Kid
 Ellen (1998) as Kid
 Saved by the Bell: The New Class (1998) as Little Zack
 Baywatch (1998) as Tyler
 Profiler (1998) as Ryan Andrews
 Chicago Hope (1998) as Young Boy
 Maggie Winters (1999) as Casey
 ER (1999) as Zach
 The Pretender (1999) as Ryan Wells
 Seven Days (1999) as Vince Collins
 Movie Stars (1999) as Marty Fineman
 Touched by an Angel (1999) as Jimmy Avery
 Martial Law (1999) as Zach Tyler
 Then Came You (2000) as Young Aidan
 Titus (2001) as Tommy
 Charmed (2001) as Ari
 Providence (2001) as Edward Joyce
 MADtv (2001) as Michael
 The Agency (2002) as Mark Steward
 7th Heaven (2002) as Frank
 The Chronicle (2002) as Victor Clark
 Philly (2002) as Benjamin Beck
 The Division (2002) as Bar Mitzvah Student
 JAG (2002) as Tommy Akers
 Birds of Prey (2002) as 10-year-old 'Guy'
 Judging Amy (2002) as Jesse Monk
 Do Over (2002) as Larry Nachman
 Who Knows the Band? (2002) as himself
 Veronica Mars (2004) as Justin Smith (Meet John Smith, Season One, Episode Three)
 The Middleman (2008) as Bobby
 Switched at Birth (2012) as Avery

Television commercials

 Intel "Big to Small" (1995)
 Good Humor Ice Cream (1995)
 HoneyBaked Ham "War Room" (1997)
 Puffs "Basketball" (1997)
 Alaska Airlines "Good Lawn Boy" and "Future Employee" (1998)
 Radio Shack "Where's Dad?" (1998)
 Bissell "Black Hole" and "Lift Off" (1998)
 Atlantic Gas "The Cook Out" (1998)
 Mybasics.com "Guttermouths" (1999)
 Buick "Fast Lane" (1999)
 Kohl's "Back to School 99" (1999)
 ERC II Titanium Driver (2001)
 SBC Communications Ameritech (2002)
 Sears "Winterizing" (2002)
 Go-Gurt (Bounce) (2002)
 Fruit Roll-Ups (2002)
 Sylvan Learning Center (2002)
 Backyard Sports (2002)
 "Hey Arnold!: The Movie" Promotion (2002)
 My Anti-Drug public service announcement (2003)
 Home Depot (2003)
 Go-Gurt "Missing A Beat" (2003)
 State Farm Insurance "First Kiss" (2004)
 Prego "Grampa" (2004)
 Anti-Smoking public service announcement (2005)
 KFC "Stop Everything" (2005)
 Nintendo DS (2005)
 Taco Bell "Bunch of Beef" (2008)
 Taco Bell "It's All About the Roosevelts" (2009)
 Petsmart (2009)
 Axe (2010)
 Dunkin' Donuts (2010)

Voice work

 Porco Rosso (1992) as additional voices (2005 Disney version)
 Men in White (1998) as additional voices
 Michael Jordan: An American Hero (1999) as additional voices
 The Road to El Dorado (2000) as additional voices
 Monsters, Inc. (2001) as Simulation Kid
 Death to Smoochy (2002) as additional voices (ADR)
 Hey Arnold!: The Movie (2002) as additional voices
 Samurai Jack (2002) as Tall Kid
 Kangaroo Jack (2003) as additional voices (ADR)
 Agent Cody Banks (2003) as additional voices (ADR)
 Big Fish (2003) as additional voices (ADR)
 The Jungle Book 2 (2003) as additional voices
 Kingdom Hearts unaired pilot (2003) as Sora
 Pinocchio 3000 (2004) as Jake
 Final Fantasy XII (2006) as Vaan
 Dissidia 012 Final Fantasy (2011) as Vaan
 Dissidia Final Fantasy NT (2018) as Vaan

References

External links
 
 

1988 births
20th-century American male actors
21st-century American male actors
21st-century American singers
21st-century American writers
21st-century American composers
Male actors from California
American dance musicians
American male film actors
American male child actors
American child singers
American male dancers
American male pop singers
American male singer-songwriters
American male television actors
American male video game actors
American male voice actors

Living people
Musicians from Downey, California
Rappers from California
Singer-songwriters from California
21st-century American rappers
21st-century American male singers